Janusz Pekowski (born 22 November 1945) is a Polish former football player and coach.

Playing career
Pekowski was born in Golub-Dobrzyń. He played for Energetyk Poznań.

Coaching career
Pekowski managed  Lech Poznań, Widzew Łódź, Arka Gdynia, Lechia Gdańsk, Degerfors IF, Pogoń Szczecin and Stilon Gorzów.

References

1945 births
Living people
People from Golub-Dobrzyń
Sportspeople from Kuyavian-Pomeranian Voivodeship
Polish footballers
Polish football managers
Lech Poznań managers
Widzew Łódź managers
Arka Gdynia managers
Lechia Gdańsk managers
Degerfors IF managers
Panachaiki F.C. managers
Pogoń Szczecin managers
GKP Gorzów Wielkopolski managers
Polish expatriate football managers
Polish expatriate sportspeople in Sweden
Expatriate football managers in Sweden
Polish expatriate sportspeople in Greece
Expatriate football managers in Greece
Association footballers not categorized by position